Elizabeth Abel (born 1945) is an American literary scholar, professor of English at the University of California, Berkeley. Abel was an assistant professor at the University of Chicago. In 1981 she was guest editor for a special issue of Critical Inquiry, 'Writing and Sexual Difference'. The essays marked a shift in feminist literary theory from "recovering a lost tradition to discovering the terms of confrontation with the dominant tradition", by means of "specific historical studies of the ways women revise prevailing themes and styles". Abel's Virginia Woolf and the fictions of psychoanalysis related Virginia Woolf's work to 1920s social anthropology and the psychoanalytic theories of Sigmund Freud and Melanie Klein.

Works
 (ed.) Writing and sexual difference. Chicago: University of Chicago Press, 1982.
 (ed. with Marianne Hirsch and Elizabeth Langland) The Voyage in : fictions of female development. Hanover, NH : Published for Dartmouth College by University Press of New England, 1983
 (ed. with Emily K. Abel) The Signs reader: women, gender, & scholarship. Chicago: University of Chicago Press, 1983.
 Virginia Woolf and the fictions of psychoanalysis. Chicago: University of Chicago Press, 1989.
 (ed. with Barbara Christian and Helene Moglen) Female subjects in black and white: race, psychoanalysis, feminism. Berkeley: University of California Press, 1997.
 Signs of the times: the visual politics of Jim Crow. Berkeley: University of California Press, 2010.

References

1945 births
Living people
American feminist writers
University of California, Berkeley College of Letters and Science faculty
American academics of English literature
University of Chicago faculty